Paolo Casali is an Italian-American immunologist. He is the Zachry Foundation Distinguished Professor at the Long School of Medicine of the University of Texas Health Science Center at San Antonio, and chairman of its department of microbiology, immunology and molecular genetics.

He is editor-in-chief of Autoimmunity.

References 

Cancer researchers
American immunologists
University of California, Irvine faculty
University of Texas Health Science Center at San Antonio faculty
Year of birth missing (living people)
Living people